Academia Juárez, previously known as Juarez Stake Academy, is the oldest private high school owned by the Church of Jesus Christ of Latter-day Saints (LDS Church) and is located in Colonia Juárez, Chihuahua, Mexico. Academia Juárez opened on September 20, 1897 with 291 students and follows a dual-language program that is unique in the country. The dual-language program starts at K-6 in two elementary schools: Colonia Dublán and Colonia Juárez and continues from 7th to 12th grade in both English and Spanish languages.

During the 2012–2013 school year, 418 students were enrolled in classes. Approximately 81% of those are Latter-day Saints; most of the remaining students (17%) are affiliated with the Catholic faith, with 2% from other faiths, each of whom pays higher tuition than the students who are LDS Church members. To enhance expectations in academic levels, the academy maintains a highly competitive admissions criteria for non-Latter-day Saints who undergo an intensive round of interviews during the admission process. Academia Juárez also offers athletics and they go by the Lobos.

See also
Church College of New Zealand
Church Educational System

References

External links
 Academia Juarez Site - especially for alumni
 Unofficial Academia Juarez Site

Church Educational System
Latter Day Saint schools
High schools in Mexico
The Church of Jesus Christ of Latter-day Saints in Mexico
Christian schools in Mexico
Educational institutions established in 1897
Education in Chihuahua (state)
1897 establishments in Mexico